No. 285 Squadron RAF was a non-operational Second World War Royal Air Force squadron that operated a variety of aircraft to provide targets for anti-aircraft gun practice initially in the North Midlands and North Wales area.

History
The squadron was formed at RAF Wrexham on 1 December 1941 from No. 9 Group AAC Flight. In 1944 the squadron moved to RAF Andover and then RAF North Weald before finally moving to RAF Weston Zoyland where it was disbanded on 26 June 1945.

Aircraft operated

References

Citations

Bibliography

 Halley, James J. The Squadrons of the Royal Air Force and Commonwealth, 1918-1988. Tonbridge, Kent, UK: Air Britain (Historians) Ltd., 1988. .
 Jefford, C.G. RAF Squadrons: A Comprehensive Record of the Movement and Equipment of All RAF Squadrons and Their Antecedents Since 1912, Shrewsbury, Shropshire, UK: Airlife Publishing, 1988. . (second revised edition 2001. .)
 Rawlings, John D.R. Coastal, Support and Special Squadrons of the RAF and their Aircraft. London: Jane's Publishing Company Ltd., 1982. .

External links
 squadron histories nos. 281-285 sqn

Military units and formations established in 1941
Aircraft squadrons of the Royal Air Force in World War II
285 Squadron
Military units and formations disestablished in 1945